Are You Lonesome Tonight? is an album featuring the original London cast of the play  Are You Lonesome Tonight?, written by Alan Bleasdale and premiering in 1985 at the Phoenix Theatre.  The album features several songs made popular by Elvis Presley.

Tracks
The cast recording includes 14 tracks:
Peace in the Valley
Heartbreak Hotel
That's Alright Mama
I Don't Care If the Sun Don't Shine
Loving You
Blue Suede Shoes
Hound Dog
If I Can Dream - Martin Shaw
All My Trials - Martin Shaw
1968 NBC TV Special: One Night/All Shook Up/Jailhouse Rock
You Gave Me a Mountain - Martin Shaw
I Was the One
If We Never Meet Again - Martin Shaw
Are You Lonesome Tonight?

References

Cast recordings
1985 soundtrack albums
Theatre soundtracks